is a city located in Mie Prefecture, Japan. , the city had an estimated population of 17,741 in 8328 households and a population density of 170 persons per km².

Geography
Toba is located on the northeastern tip of Shima Peninsula in far eastern Mie Prefecture, facing Ise Bay of the Pacific Ocean to the north and east. The area is famous for oysters and for cultured pearls. The entire city area is within the borders of the Ise-Shima National Park.

Toba administers numerous islands in the Ise Bay, the most important of which are:
Kamishima
Kozukumi Island
Ōzukumi-jima
Sugashima
Tōshijima
Sakatejima
Mitsujima

Neighboring municipalities
Mie Prefecture
Ise
Shima

Climate
Toba has a Humid subtropical climate (Köppen Cfa) characterized by warm summers and cool winters with light to no snowfall.

Demographics
Per Japanese census data, the population of Toba has decreased rapidly over the past 30 years.

History
The area of modern Toba has been continuously inhabited since before the Jōmon period. During the Sengoku period, the area was under the control of pirates, from whom emerged Kuki Yoshitaka (from Nakiri district) as a dominant ruler. After having dominated the local seacoasts, he established Toba as his capital and built a castle there.  Under the Tokugawa shogunate, the castle became the center for Toba Domain. In the Edo period, Toba flourished in trade and as a transshipment port between Osaka and Edo.

The town of Toba was created with the establishment of the modern municipalities system on April 1, 1889. Toba was raised to city status on November 1, 1954, by merging with seven neighboring villages in Shima District.

Government
Toba has a mayor-council form of government with a directly elected mayor and a unicameral city council of 14 members. Toba contributes one member to the Mie Prefectural Assembly. In terms of national politics, the city is part of Mie 4th district of the lower house of the Diet of Japan.

Economy
Commercial fishing, including cultivated pearls, and tourism play important roles in the local economy.

Education
Toba has nine public elementary schools and five public middle schools operated by the city government and one public high school operated by the Mie Prefectural Department of Education. The Toba National College of Maritime Technology,  one of the five maritime technology colleges in Japan which  offers merchant marine programs such as Deck officer, Marine Engineering and other advanced programs related to maritime education. is located in Toba, as is the Sugashima Marine Biological Laboratory - Graduate School of Science, Nagoya University.

Culture
Toba city hosts the highest number of ama divers in Japan. "Toba and Shima, cities where you can meet ama divers" has been defined as the 73th stories of Japanese heritage.

Transportation

Railway
  JR Tōkai - Sangū Line
 
 Kintetsu Railway - Toba Line
  - 
 Kintetsu Railway -  Shima Line
  -  -  -  -  -  -

Highway
Iseshima Skyline

Ferry
Ise-wan Ferry

Local attractions
Mikimoto Pearl Island
Toba Aquarium
Toba Castle
Toba Sea-Folk Museum

Sister city relations
 - Santa Barbara, California, since 1966.
 - Sanda, Hyōgo, Friendship city since July 1, 1971

Notable people from Toba
Mikimoto Kōkichi, Entrepreneur and businessman
Mitsuru Hattori, Manga artist
Tsunekazu Ishihara, President of The Pokémon Company

External links

 
 
Official city website(in Japanese)
Toba tourism association official website (in Japanese)
 A Day Tripper's Guide to Ise and Toba Japanzine by Zack Davisson

References

Cities in Mie Prefecture
Populated coastal places in Japan
Toba, Mie